Olga Vasiljonok (born May 17, 1980) is a Belarusian cross-country skier who has been competing since 2000. She finished sixth in the team sprint at the FIS Nordic World Ski Championships 2007 in Sapporo and earned her best individual finish of 17th in the individual sprint event at the 2009 championships in Liberec.

Vasiljonok's best individual finish at the Winter Olympics was 25th in the sprint at Turin in 2006.

She won three individual bronze medals in the 2007 Winter Universiade (Sprint, 7.5 km + 7.5 km double pursuit, 30 km). Vasiljonok's best individual World Cup finish was 11th in a sprint event in Germany in 2004.

References

1980 births
Belarusian female cross-country skiers
Cross-country skiers at the 2006 Winter Olympics
Cross-country skiers at the 2010 Winter Olympics
Living people
Olympic cross-country skiers of Belarus
Universiade medalists in cross-country skiing
Universiade bronze medalists for Belarus
Cross-country skiers at the 2007 Winter Universiade